Kevin Lacroix may refer to:

 Kevin Lacroix (racing driver) (born 1989), Canadian racing driver
 Kévin Lacroix (footballer) (born 1984), French football player